The 1933–34 Georgetown Hoyas men's basketball team represented Georgetown University during the 1933–34 NCAA college basketball season. Fred Mesmer coached it in his third season as head coach. The team was a member of the Eastern Intercollegiate Conference (EIC) and played its home games at Tech Gymnasium on the campus of McKinley Technical High School in Washington, D.C. The team was the first of two winning teams during Mesmers seven-season tenure, finishing with a record of 12-11 overall, 5-5 in the EIC.

Season recap

Junior forward Ed Hargaden emerged as Georgetown's star player this season, especially during the latter part of the schedule. He scored 18 of the Hoyas 30 points against Canisius, 15 of their 27 in an EIC game at Pittsburgh, 20 of their 53 points in a victory over Loyola of Maryland, and 15 of their 32 in a 32-28 win over EIC rival Carnegie Tech in the season finale. He finished the season with an average of 10.1 points per game – a considerable achievement in a low-scoring era – and was Georgetowns leading scorer for the second straight year, as he would be in all three seasons of his varsity career.

The teams 12-11 record gave Georgetown its best record since the 1929-30 season and its only winning record between the 1929–30 and 1936-37 seasons.

Hargadens son, guard Ed Hargaden Jr., would become the first second-generation Georgetown mens basketball player, playing for Georgetown on the 1957-58, 1958-59, and 1959-60 teams. The Hargadens would be the only father and son to play for the Hoyas until center Patrick Ewings son, forward Patrick Ewing Jr., joined the team in the 2006-07 season.

Roster
Sources

This was the first season in which Georgetown players wore numbers on their jerseys.

Awards and honors

Ed Hargaden was named an all-EIC player and an honorable mention All-American, Georgetowns first basketball player to receive an All-America honor of any kind.

1933–34 schedule and results
Sources

It was common practice at this time for colleges and universities to include non-collegiate opponents in their schedules, with the games recognized as part of their official record for the season, and the February 1, 1934, game played against the Brooklyn Knights of Columbus therefore counted as part of Georgetowns won-loss record for 1933-34. It was not until 1952, after the completion of the 1951-52 season, that the National Collegiate Athletic Association (NCAA) ruled that colleges and universities could no longer count games played against non-collegiate opponents in their annual won-loss records.

|-
!colspan=9 style="background:#002147; color:#8D817B;"| Regular Season

References

Georgetown Hoyas men's basketball seasons
Georgetown Hoyas
Georgetown Hoyas men's basketball team
Georgetown Hoyas men's basketball team